Neal Adams was a comic artist and creator who worked on a large number of comic books and characters, particularly for DC Comics and Marvel Comics, and even creating his own company, Continuity Comics

Bibliography
Comics work (pencil art, except where noted) includes:

Interior art

Continuity
Armor #8 (among other artists) (1990)
Captain Power and the Soldiers of the Future #1–2 (1988–89)
Echo of Futurepast (Frankenstein) #1–5 (1984–85)
Ms Mystic #1–2
Revengers featuring Megalith #1–5 (1986–88)
ToyBoy #1 (with Win Mortimer) (1986)
Valeria the She-Bat #1, 5 (writer/art) (1993)

DC

Action Comics (Human Target) #425 (1973), #1000 (5-page story) (2018)
The Adventures of Bob Hope #106–109 (1967–68)
The Adventures of Jerry Lewis #101–104 (1967)
All-New Collectors' Edition (Superman vs. Muhammad Ali) #C-56 (1978)
The Amazing World of DC Comics Special #1 (Superman story, 1976)
Aquaman (Deadman backup stories) #50–52 (1970)
Batman #219 (backup story); #232, 234, 237, 243–245, 251, 255 (1970–74)
Batman Black and White, vol. 2, #1 (among other artists) (2013)
Batman, vol. 3, Annual #1  (Batman/Harley Quinn, 2016)
Batman Odyssey, miniseries, #1–6 (writer/art) (2010–11)
Batman Odyssey, vol. 2, miniseries, #1–7 (writer/art) (2011–12)
Batman vs Ra's al Ghul, miniseries, #1–6 (2019–21)
The Brave and the Bold #79–86, 93 (1968–71); #102 (along with Jim Aparo) (1972)
Challengers of the Unknown #74 (along with George Tuska) (1970)
Deadman, miniseries, #1–6 (writer/ art) (2017–2018)
Detective Comics (Elongated Man backup story) #369; (Batman) #395, 397, 400, 402, 404, 407, 408, 410 (1967–71)
Detective Comics, vol. 2, #27 (among other artists, 2014)
The Flash (Green Lantern/Green Arrow backup stories) #217–219, 226 (1972–74)
Green Lantern  #76–87, 89 (1970–72)
Hot Wheels #6 (1970)
Harley's Little Black Book #5 (Harley Quinn/Superman, 2016)
House of Mystery, vol. 1, #178–179, 186, 228 (1969–75)
House of Mystery, vol. 2, #13 (2009)
Justice for All includes Children #1–2, 6–7 (public service pages, 1976)
Justice League of America #94 (four pages, 1971)
The Kamandi Challenge #2 (2017)
Our Army at War #182–183, 186, 240 (1967–72)
Phantom Stranger, vol. 2, #4 (1969)
Spectre #2–5 (1968)
Star Spangled War Stories #134, 144 (1967–69)
Strange Adventures (Deadman) #206–211, 214 (art); #212–213, 215–216 (writer/art) (1967–69)
Superman ("Private Life of Clark Kent") #254 (1972)
Superman: The Coming of the Supermen, miniseries, #1–6 (writer/art) (2016)
Teen Titans #20–22 (1969)
Weird War Tales #8 (1972)
Weird Western Tales (El Diablo)  #12–13, 15 (1972)
Witching Hour #8 (1970)
World's Finest Comics (Superman/Batman) #175–176 (1968)

Notes

Marvel

Amazing Adventures, vol. 2 (Inhumans) #5–8 (1971), #18 (along with Howard Chaykin) (1973)
Avengers #93–96 (1971–72)
Bizarre Adventures OCT 1981
Conan The Barbarian #37 (1974)
Crazy Magazine #2 (1974)
 The Deadly Hands of Kung Fu 1974 #1, #3, #4
Dracula Lives #2 (1973)
Epic Illustrated #7 (1981)
Fantastic Four: Antithesis #1–4 (2020)First X-Men, miniseries, #1–5 (2012–13)Kull and the Barbarians #2 1975Monsters Unleashed (comics) #3 (1973)New Avengers, vol. 2, #16.1 (2011)Savage Sword of Conan 1974 #1, #14 (1976)Savage Tales #4 (along with Gil Kane) (1974)Thor #180–181 (1970)Tower of Shadows #2 (1969)X-Men #56–63, 65 (1969–70)
 Unknown Worlds of Science Fiction #1, January 1975X-Men Giant-Size #3 (2005)Young Avengers Special #1 (among other artists) (2006)

Other publishers
 Creepy #14–16, 32, 75 (Warren, 1967–75)
 Dark Horse Presents, vol. 2, ("Blood" feature) #1–3, 5–8, 11, 29 (Dark Horse, 2011–13)
 Eerie #9–10 (Warren, 1967)
 Emergency! JULY 1976
 Harpoon JAN 1973
 International Insanity, SEPT 1976
 Knighthawk #2–6 (Acclaim)
 National Lampoon 1971 November Dragula, 1972 January, August, December Son-O-God, October The Ventures of Zimmerman, 1974 May Son-O-God meets Zimmerman, Oct Dec Son-O-God, 1975 July Airport 69 (3D), September Adenoidal, 1976 January A Few Bold Lads, October Tod Tunes, 1978 February Sgt. Nick Penis, October The Deal     
 Playboy June 1957, page 57
 The Six Million Dollar Man July 1976
 Vampirella #1 (Warren, 1969), #10
 Batman and Robin: Stacked Cards, book-and-record set #PR27 (Peter Pan, 1975) 
 Batman and Robin: Robin meets Man-Bat, book-and-record set #PR30 (Peter Pan, 1976) 

Notes

Cover art

DCA Heroic Journey #1 (2016)Action Comics 356, 358–359, 361–364, 366–367, 370–374, 377–379, 398–400, 402, 404–405, 419, 466, 468, 473, 485 (1967–78)Action Comics, vol. 2, #49 (variant, 2016)Adventure Comics #365–369, 371–373, 375 (1968)All-Star Batman and Robin #8–9 (variant) (2008)All-Star Superman #1 (variant) (2006)Batman #200, 203, 210, 217–218, 220–227, 229–231, 235–236, 238–241 (1968–72), Annual #14 (1990)Batman, vol. 2, #49 (variant, 2016)Batman, vol. 3, #28 (variant, 2017)Batman/Teenage Mutant Ninja Turtles #1 (variant, 2016)Before Watchmen: Dr. Manhattan #3 (variant, 2012)Batman/Superman #29 (variant, 2016)Brave and the Bold #76 (1968)Challengers of the Unknown #67–68, 70, 72 (1969–70)Cyborg #8 (variant, 2016)The Dark Knight III: The Master Race #1 (2016)DC 100 Page Super Spectacular #6, 13DC Special #3–4, 6, 11 (1969–71), #29 (1977)DC Special Blue Ribbon Digest #16 (1981)DC Special Series #1 (1977)Deadman #1–7 (reprints of Strange Adventures #206–216) (1985)Deathstroke, vol. 2, #15 (variant, 2016)Detective Comics #372, 385, 389, 391–392, 394, 396, 398–399, 401, 403, 405–406, 409, 411–422, 439 (1968–74)Detective Comics, vol. 2, #49 (variant, 2016)First Wave (Doc Savage, The Spirit, Batman) #1 (variant, 2010)The Flash #194–195, 203–204, 206–208, 213, 215 (1970–72), #246 (1977)The Flash, vol. 4, #49 (variant, 2016)Forbidden Tales of Dark Mansion #9 (1973)From Beyond the Unknown #6 (1970)G.I. Combat #168, 201–202 (1974–77)Grayson #17 (variant, 2016)Green Arrow, vol. 5, #44, 49 (variant, 2015–16)Green Arrow, vol. 6, #1–17 (variant, 2016–17)Green Lantern #63 (1968)Green Lantern, vol. 5, #49 (variant, 2016)Green Lantern 80th. Anniversary 100-Page #1 (variant, 2020)Green Lantern/Green Arrow #1–7 (reprints of Green Lantern #76–89) (1983–84)Heart Throbs #120 (1969)Heroes against Hunger, one-shot (1986)Hot Wheels #2–3 (1970)House of Mystery #175–192, 197, 199 (1968–72); #251–254 (1977)House of Secrets #81–82, 84–88, 90–91 (1969–71)The Joker, vol. 2, #1–4, 6 (variants, 2021)Justice League of America #66–67, 70, 74, 79, 82, 86–89, 91, 92, 94–98 (1968–72); #138–139 (1977)Limited Collectors' Edition #C-25, C-51, C-52, C-59 (1974–78)Martian Manhunter #9 (variant, 2016)Mystery in Space, vol. 2, #1 (variant, 2006)Our Fighting Forces #147 (1974)Phantom Stranger, vol. 2, #3–19 (1969–72)Red Hood/Arsenal #9 (variant, 2016)Robin, Son of Batman #9 (variant, 2016)Saga of Ra's Al Ghul, reprint miniseries, #4 (1988)Salvation Run #7 (variant, 2008)Scooby Apocalypse #1 (variant, 2016)Secret Hearts #134 (1969)Showcase (Phantom Stranger) #80 (1969)Sinestro #20 (variant, 2016)Starfire #9 (variant, 2016)Superboy #143, 145–146, 148–153, 155, 157–161, 163–164, 166–168, 172–173, 175–176, 178 (1967–71)Superman #204–208, 210, 214–215, 231, 233–237, 240–243, 250–252, 263 (1968–73); #307–308, 317 (1977)Superman, vol. 3, #49 (variant, 2016)The Superman Family #183–185 (1977)Superman/Wonder Woman #26 (variant, 2016)Superman: Lois & Clark #5 (variant, 2016)Superman's Girl Friend, Lois Lane #79, 81–88, 90–91 (1967–69)Superman's Pal Jimmy Olsen #109–112, 115, 118, 134–136, 147–148 (full art); #137–138, 141–142, 144 (inks over Jack Kirby pencils) (1968–72)Tales of the Unexpected (then changes title to Unexpected) #104, 110, 112–115, 118, 121, 124 (1967–71)Tales of the Unexpected, miniseries, #1 (variant) (2006)Teen Titans, vol. 5, #17 (variant, 2016)Telos #5 (variant, 2016)Titans Hunt #5 (variant, 2016)Tomahawk #116–119, 121, 123–130 (1968–70)We Are Robin #9 (variant, 2016)Wonder Woman, vol. 4, #49 (variant, 2016)Wonder Woman/Conan, miniseries, #5 (variant) (DC/Dark Horse, 2018)World's Finest Comics #174, 178–180, 183, 199–205, 208–211; #244–246, 258 (full art); #182, 185–186 (inks over Curt Swan pencils) (1968–79)

MarvelAll-New Captain America #3 (variant, 2015)Avengers #92 (1971)Avengers World #6 (2014)Avengers Finale (2005)Civil War II #1 (variant, 2016)Captain Marvel, vol. 3, #15 (2003)Conan: Serpent War, miniseries, #1 (variant, 2020)Deadly Hands of Kung Fu #1–4, 11–12, 14, 17 (painted covers, 1974–75)Defenders, vol. 4, #1 (variant, 2017)Doctor Strange, vol. 3, #1 (2015)Dracula Lives #3 (painted cover, 1975)Epic Illustrated #6 (1981)Ghost Rider, vol. 5, #1 (variant, 2011)The Incredible Hulk, vol. 4, #1 (variant, 2011)Incredible Hulks #635 (variant, 2011)Invincible Iron Man, vol. 2, #6 (variant, 2016)Legion of Monsters #1 (painted cover, 1975)Marvel Feature #1 (1971)Monsters Unleashed #3 (painted cover, 1973)The Punisher, vol. 7, #1 (variant, 2011)Savage Sword of Conan #2 (painted cover, 1974)Savage Tales #4–6 (painted covers, 1974)Secret Wars #1 (variant, 2015)Tomb of Dracula #1 (1972), #7 (1973)Ultimate Comics: Hawkeye #1 (variant, 2011)Uncanny Avengers #1 (variant, 2012)

Other PublishersBack Issue! #10, 18, 45 (TwoMorrows, 2005–10)Comic Book Artist #1 (TwoMorrows, 1998)The Comics Journal #73 Iron Jaw #1–2 (Atlas/Seaboard, 1975)Mighty Mouse #1 (variant), #2 (Dynamite, 2017)Planet of Vampires #1–2 (Atlas/Seaboard, 1975)Reconcilers (Viking Warrior Press, 2010)Red Sonja #4 (variant) (Dynamite, 2006)The Shadow, vol. 2, #1 (variant) (Dynamite, 2017)Six Million Dollar Man #2 (painted cover) (Charlton, 1976)Star Trek/Green Lantern #1 (variant) (IDW, 2015)Tales of the Green Hornet, vol. 2, #1 (Now, 1992)Thrilling Adventure Stories #2 (Atlas/Seaboard, 1975)WildC.A.T.s/X-Men: The Silver Age (variant) (Image/Marvel, 1997)Write Now! #9 (TwoMorrows, 2005)Always Ontime: Chaos City (Panopolis Comics, 2021)

Books and compilations
(These books feature a new cover by Adams):Art of Neal Adams 1 (1975)Art of Neal Adams 2 (1977)Avengers: The Kree-Skrull War, 208 pages TPB (2000) Batman Illustrated by Neal Adams Vol. 1, 240 pages HC (2003) Batman Illustrated by Neal Adams Vol. 2, 236 pages HC (2004) Batman Illustrated by Neal Adams Vol. 3, 280 pages HC (2006) DC Universe Illustrated by Neal Adams Vol. 1, 192 pages HC (2008)The Deadman Collection, 342 pages HC (2001)  The Greatest Team-Up Stories Ever Told (softcover edition) (1990)The Green Lantern/Green Arrow Collection HC (2000) Hard-Traveling Heroes: The Green Lantern/Green Arrow Collection Volume One TPB (1992) The Green Lantern/Green Arrow Collection Volume Two: More Hard-Traveling Heroes TPB (1993) Green Lantern/Green Arrow Volume One, 176 pages TPB (2004) Green Lantern/Green Arrow Volume Two, 200 pages TPB (2004) The Neal Adams Index (1974) (Doug Murray & Frank Verzyl, publishers)Neal Adams Monsters, HC (2004)Neal Adams Treasury 1, 60 pages (1976)Neal Adams Treasury 2, 56 pages (1979)Sketch Book (1999)X-Men Visionaries: Neal Adams, 208 pages TPB (2000) 

Notes

OtherDC Super Calendar 1976 (complete calendar); 1977–78 (cover)Calendar art at Neal Adams website (Archive 3 Oct 2002)The Far-Gate Experience (poster, characters of TV series Farscape and Stargate SG-1''), Sci Fi Channel

References

External links
Some art galleries at the Adams official website

Bibliographies by writer
Bibliographies of American writers
 
Continuity Comics
Lists of comics by creator